Platysmurus is a genus of treepie in the family Corvidae.

It contains the following species:
 Malayan black magpie (Platysmurus leucopterus)
 Bornean black magpie (Platysmurus aterrimus)

References

Platysmurus
Bird genera
Taxa named by Ludwig Reichenbach